Galt is a city in Sacramento County, California. It is part of the Sacramento metropolitan area. The population was 23,647 at the 2010 census, up from 19,472 at the 2000 census.

Geography

The city is bordered entirely by unincorporated areas of both Sacramento and San Joaquin Counties.

Toponymy

Galt was named in 1869 after the former city of Galt in Canada, now part of Cambridge, the hometown of John McFarland.

Climate
According to the Köppen Climate Classification system, Galt has a warm-summer Mediterranean climate, abbreviated "Csa" on climate maps.

Demographics

2010
At the 2010 census Galt had a population of 23,647. The racial makeup of Galt was 15,639 (66.1%) White, 430 (1.8%) African American, 361 (1.5%) Native American, 815 (3.4%) Asian, 108 (0.5%) Pacific Islander, 4,834 (20.4%) from other races, and 1,460 (6.2%) from two or more races. Hispanic or Latino of any race were 10,113 persons (42.8%).

The census reported that 23,498 people (99.4% of the population) lived in households, 32 (0.1%) lived in non-institutionalized group quarters, and 117 (0.5%) were institutionalized.

There were 7,262 households, 3,516 (48.4%) had children under the age of 18 living in them, 4,431 (61.0%) were opposite-sex married couples living together, 895 (12.3%) had a female householder with no husband present, 465 (6.4%) had a male householder with no wife present.  There were 431 (5.9%) unmarried opposite-sex partnerships, and 32 (0.4%) same-sex married couples or partnerships. 1,171 households (16.1%) were one person and 547 (7.5%) had someone living alone who was 65 or older. The average household size was 3.24. There were 5,791 families (79.7% of households); the average family size was 3.62.

The age distribution was 7,347 people (31.1%) under the age of 18, 2,262 people (9.6%) aged 18 to 24, 6,344 people (26.8%) aged 25 to 44, 5,414 people (22.9%) aged 45 to 64, and 2,280 people (9.6%) who were 65 or older. The median age was 32.4 years. For every 100 females, there were 97.4 males.  For every 100 females age 18 and over, there were 94.3 males.

There were 7,678 housing units at an average density of 1,291.6 per square mile, of the occupied units 5,344 (73.6%) were owner-occupied and 1,918 (26.4%) were rented. The homeowner vacancy rate was 2.3%; the rental vacancy rate was 5.2%. 17,034 people (72.0% of the population) lived in owner-occupied housing units and 6,464 people (27.3%) lived in rental housing units.

2000
At the 2000 census there were 19,472 people in 5,974 households, including 4,886 families, in the city. The population density was 1,280.8/km (3,316.6/mi2).  There were 6,211 housing units at an average density of 408.5/km (1,057.9/mi2).  The racial makeup of the city was 70.49% White, 1.16% African American, 1.05% Native American, 2.84% Asian, 0.16% Pacific Islander, 18.57% from other races, and 5.74% from two or more races. 33.20% of the population were Hispanic or Latino of any race.
Of the 5,974 households 49.7% had children under the age of 18 living with them, 65.1% were married couples living together, 11.6% had a female householder with no husband present, and 18.2% were non-families. 14.5% of households were one person and 6.5% were one person aged 65 or older. The average household size was 3.23 and the average family size was 3.57.

The age distribution was 34.5% under the age of 18, 8.1% from 18 to 24, 32.5% from 25 to 44, 16.5% from 45 to 64, and 8.5% who are 65 or older. The median age was 31 years. For every 100 females, there were 98.0 males. For every 100 females age 18 and over, there were 95.5 males.

The median household income was $45,052 and the median family income  was $47,845. Males had a median income of $38,258 versus $26,541 for females. The per capita income for the city was $16,620. 10.6% of the population and 8.5% of families were below the poverty line. Out of the total population, 13.7% were under the age of 18 and 6.7% were 65 or older.

Public safety

Fire department 

The local fire department is owned and operated by the Cosumnes Community Services District. Founded in 1893, Elk Grove's Fire Department started with a single hose cart and a small group of dedicated volunteers. From these humble beginnings, the Department has forged a lasting presence in the community. Continued growth and innovation in the fire service has prompted a diverse array of new Fire Department projects and responsibilities. Each year, the Fire Prevention Bureau conducts hundreds of new construction inspections and plan reviews and actively implements annual weed abatement and fireworks enforcement campaigns. Moreover, the Public Education Division coordinates a number of safety activities including "Change Your Clock-Change Your Smoke Detector Batteries" Campaign, the Juvenile Firesetters Intervention Program, the Life Jacket Loan-Out Program and Car Seat Safety Inspections. A new Special Operations Division was formed in 2007 that oversees the specialized rescue, hazardous materials, and disaster preparedness needs for the Cosumnes CSD Fire Department.

As they have done for more than 100 years, the members of the Cosumnes CSD Fire Department maintain their commitment to protecting the lives, property and environment from fire and other natural and manmade disasters and emergencies in a courteous, timely and effective manner. In 2010, Tracey M. Hansen, a 17-year veteran of the Cosumnes CSD Fire Department was named the new Fire Chief by CSD General Manager Jeff Ramos, the latest achievement in a career she began as a paramedic. Hansen named John Michelini as her Deputy Chief and the team immediately began developing strategies to effectively manage the Fire Department during the recession.

Government
Galt operates under an elected council form of government. The Mayor of Galt is peer elected by the entire City Council. Currently, the council members (with end of term in parentheses) are: Mayor Shawn Farmer (2022), Vice Mayor Paul Sandhu (2022), Council Member Rich Lazano (2022), Council Member Kevin Papineau (2024) and Council Member Jay Vandenburg (2024).

Current Sacramento County Supervisor Don Nottoli served as the youngest member of the Galt City Council in 1978 at just 23 years old, while Andrew J. Meredith served as its youngest Mayor in 2007 at 27 years old.

Media
Galt has had a weekly newspaper, The Galt Herald, since 1909. It has been owned and operated by the same family since 1959, the Herburgers of Herburger Publications, Inc. As of 2020, the Galt Herald Managing Editor is Bonnie Rodriguez.

Education
Galt Joint Union High School District operates the city's public high schools.

Community

Galt is home to many civic groups and clubs. The Galt Area Historical Society is very active and has more than 500 members. The Performing Animal Welfare Society is a place where retired, abandoned or abused performing animals and victims of the exotic animal trade can live in peace and contentment. The Galt Lions Club is part of Lions International and helps the local visually impaired repair their vision.

Galt is well known for the Flea Market, also known as Galt Market.

Cosumnes River country holds a very special place among California landscapes. The Cosumnes River Preserve was created to safeguard much of that landscape.

The city hosts an annual winter bird festival, in conjunction with the Cosumnes River Preserve, as many birds winter in and around the city.

Brewster House, on the National Register of Historic Places, is located there.

The Galt Arno Cemetery District is located in Galt.

The California Department of Corrections "Boot Camp" School is located in Galt.

Notable people
LeVar Burton, at the age of thirteen, entered St. Pius X seminary in Galt to become a priest.
Ryan Mattheus, former pitcher for the Washington Nationals and Cincinnati Reds of Major League Baseball
Zach Phillips, former MLB pitcher
Stephanie Brown Trafton, gold medalist in the discus throw at the 2008 Summer Olympics

Adjacent areas

References

Cities in Sacramento County, California
Cities in Sacramento metropolitan area
1946 establishments in California
Populated places established in 1946
Incorporated cities and towns in California